Corrado Varesco (born 18 November 1938) is an Italian biathlete. He competed in the relay event at the 1972 Winter Olympics.

References

External links
 

1938 births
Living people
Italian male biathletes
Olympic biathletes of Italy
Biathletes at the 1972 Winter Olympics
Sportspeople from Trentino